Leonardo Maia (born December 4, 1980) is a Brazilian former racing driver. He began racing professionally in the Barber Dodge Pro Series in 2001 and he won the series championship in 2003. In 2004 he moved to the Infiniti Pro Series (now Indy Lights) for Brian Stewart Racing and finished 5th in the championship with a pair of 3rd-place finishes. The following year he made two Toyota Atlantic starts for Jensen MotorSport and he participated full-time in 2006 for Forsythe Championship Racing, finishing 9th in points with a best finish of 5th (twice). He retired from professional racing afterwards.

Motorsports career results

American Open-Wheel racing results
(key) (Races in bold indicate pole position, races in italics indicate fastest race lap)

Barber Dodge Pro Series

Indy Lights

Champ Car Atlantic

External links
Leonardo Maia at Driver Database

1980 births
Living people
Brazilian racing drivers
Atlantic Championship drivers
Indy Lights drivers
Barber Pro Series drivers
Indy Pro 2000 Championship drivers

Forsythe Racing drivers